The arrondissement of Dieppe is an arrondissement of France in the Seine-Maritime department in the Normandy région. It has 343 communes.

Composition

The communes of the arrondissement of Dieppe, and their INSEE codes, are:

 Ambrumesnil (76004)
 Ancourt (76008)
 Ancourteville-sur-Héricourt (76009)
 Angiens (76015)
 Anglesqueville-la-Bras-Long (76016)
 Anneville-sur-Scie (76019)
 Ardouval (76024)
 Argueil (76025)
 Arques-la-Bataille (76026)
 Aubéguimont (76028)
 Aubermesnil-aux-Érables (76029)
 Aubermesnil-Beaumais (76030)
 Auberville-la-Manuel (76032)
 Aumale (76035)
 Auppegard (76036)
 Autigny (76040)
 Auvilliers (76042)
 Auzouville-sur-Saâne (76047)
 Avesnes-en-Bray (76048)
 Avesnes-en-Val (76049)
 Avremesnil (76050)
 Bacqueville-en-Caux (76051)
 Bailleul-Neuville (76052)
 Baillolet (76053)
 Bailly-en-Rivière (76054)
 Baromesnil (76058)
 Bazinval (76059)
 Beaubec-la-Rosière (76060)
 Beaussault (76065)
 Beautot (76066)
 Beauval-en-Caux (76063)
 Beauvoir-en-Lyons (76067)
 Bellencombre (76070)
 Bellengreville (76071)
 Belleville-en-Caux (76072)
 La Bellière (76074)
 Belmesnil (76075)
 Bertheauville (76083)
 Bertreville (76084)
 Bertreville-Saint-Ouen (76085)
 Bertrimont (76086)
 Beuzeville-la-Guérard (76091)
 Bézancourt (76093)
 Biville-la-Baignarde (76096)
 Biville-la-Rivière (76097)
 Blangy-sur-Bresle (76101)
 Blosseville (76104)
 Le Bois-Robert (76112)
 Bosc-Bérenger (76119)
 Bosc-Hyons (76124)
 Bosc-Mesnil (76126)
 Bosville (76128)
 Bouelles (76130)
 Le Bourg-Dun (76133)
 Bourville (76134)
 Brachy (76136)
 Bracquetuit (76138)
 Bradiancourt (76139)
 Brametot (76140)
 Brémontier-Merval (76142)
 Bully (76147)
 Bures-en-Bray (76148)
 Butot-Vénesville (76732)
 Cailleville (76151)
 Callengeville (76122)
 Calleville-les-Deux-Églises (76153)
 Campneuseville (76154)
 Canehan (76155)
 Canouville (76156)
 Cany-Barville (76159)
 Le Catelier (76162)
 Le Caule-Sainte-Beuve (76166)
 Les Cent-Acres (76168)
 La Chapelle-du-Bourgay (76170)
 La Chapelle-Saint-Ouen (76171)
 La Chapelle-sur-Dun (76172)
 La Chaussée (76173)
 Clais (76175)
 Clasville (76176)
 Cleuville (76180)
 Colmesnil-Manneville (76184)
 Compainville (76185)
 Conteville (76186)
 Crasville-la-Mallet (76189)
 Crasville-la-Rocquefort (76190)
 Criel-sur-Mer (76192)
 La Crique (76193)
 Criquetot-sur-Longueville (76197)
 Criquiers (76199)
 Critot (76200)
 Croisy-sur-Andelle (76201)
 Croixdalle (76202)
 Cropus (76204)
 Crosville-sur-Scie (76205)
 Cuverville-sur-Yères (76207)
 Cuy-Saint-Fiacre (76208)
 Dampierre-en-Bray (76209)
 Dampierre-Saint-Nicolas (76210)
 Dancourt (76211)
 Dénestanville (76214)
 Dieppe (76217)
 Doudeauville (76218)
 Douvrend (76220)
 Drosay (76221)
 Elbeuf-en-Bray (76229)
 Ellecourt (76233)
 Envermeu (76235)
 Ermenouville (76241)
 Ernemont-la-Villette (76242)
 Esclavelles (76244)
 Étaimpuis (76249)
 Étalondes (76252)
 Eu (76255)
 Fallencourt (76257)
 Ferrières-en-Bray (76260)
 La Ferté-Saint-Samson (76261)
 Fesques (76262)
 La Feuillie (76263)
 Flamets-Frétils (76265)
 Flocques (76266)
 Fontaine-en-Bray (76269)
 Fontaine-le-Dun (76272)
 La Fontelaye (76274)
 Forges-les-Eaux (76276)
 Foucarmont (76278)
 Fréauville (76280)
 Fresles (76283)
 Fresnay-le-Long (76284)
 Fresnoy-Folny (76286)
 Freulleville (76288)
 Fry (76292)
 La Gaillarde (76294)
 Gaillefontaine (76295)
 Gancourt-Saint-Étienne (76297)
 Gonnetot (76306)
 Gonneville-sur-Scie (76308)
 Gournay-en-Bray (76312)
 Grainville-la-Teinturière (76315)
 Grandcourt (76320)
 Les Grandes-Ventes (76321)
 Graval (76323)
 Grèges (76324)
 Greuville (76327)
 Gruchet-Saint-Siméon (76330)
 Grumesnil (76332)
 Guerville (76333)
 Gueures (76334)
 Gueutteville (76335)
 Gueutteville-les-Grès (76336)
 La Hallotière (76338)
 Le Hanouard (76339)
 Haucourt (76343)
 Haudricourt (76344)
 Haussez (76345)
 Hautot-l'Auvray (76346)
 Hautot-sur-Mer (76349)
 La Haye (76352)
 Héberville (76353)
 Hermanville (76356)
 Le Héron (76358)
 Heugleville-sur-Scie (76360)
 Hodeng-au-Bosc (76363)
 Hodeng-Hodenger (76364)
 Houdetot (76365)
 Les Ifs (76371)
 Illois (76372)
 Imbleville (76373)
 Incheville (76374)
 Ingouville (76375)
 Lamberville (76379)
 Lammerville (76380)
 Landes-Vieilles-et-Neuves (76381)
 Lestanville (76383)
 Lintot-les-Bois (76389)
 Londinières (76392)
 Longmesnil (76393)
 Longroy (76394)
 Longueil (76395)
 Longueville-sur-Scie (76397)
 Lucy (76399)
 Luneray (76400)
 Malleville-les-Grès (76403)
 Manéhouville (76405)
 Manneville-ès-Plains (76407)
 Marques (76411)
 Martigny (76413)
 Martin-Église (76414)
 Massy (76415)
 Mathonville (76416)
 Maucomble (76417)
 Mauquenchy (76420)
 Melleville (76422)
 Ménerval (76423)
 Ménonval (76424)
 Mésangueville (76426)
 Mesnières-en-Bray (76427)
 Le Mesnil-Durdent (76428)
 Mesnil-Follemprise (76430)
 Le Mesnil-Lieubray (76431)
 Mesnil-Mauger (76432)
 Le Mesnil-Réaume (76435)
 Meulers (76437)
 Millebosc (76438)
 Molagnies (76440)
 Monchaux-Soreng (76441)
 Monchy-sur-Eu (76442)
 Montérolier (76445)
 Montreuil-en-Caux (76449)
 Montroty (76450)
 Morienne (76606)
 Mortemer (76454)
 Morville-sur-Andelle (76455)
 Muchedent (76458)
 Nesle-Hodeng (76459)
 Nesle-Normandeuse (76460)
 Neufbosc (76461)
 Neufchâtel-en-Bray (76462)
 Neuf-Marché (76463)
 Neuville-Ferrières (76465)
 Néville (76467)
 Nolléval (76469)
 Normanville (76470)
 Notre-Dame-d'Aliermont (76472)
 Notre-Dame-du-Parc (76478)
 Nullemont (76479)
 Ocqueville (76480)
 Offranville (76482)
 Oherville (76483)
 Omonville (76485)
 Osmoy-Saint-Valery (76487)
 Ouainville (76488)
 Ourville-en-Caux (76490)
 Ouville-la-Rivière (76492)
 Paluel (76493)
 Petit-Caux (76618)
 Pierrecourt (76500)
 Pleine-Sève (76504)
 Pommereux (76505)
 Pommeréval (76506)
 Ponts-et-Marais (76507)
 Preuseville (76511)
 Puisenval (76512)
 Quiberville (76515)
 Quièvrecourt (76516)
 Rainfreville (76519)
 Réalcamp (76520)
 Rétonval (76523)
 Ricarville-du-Val (76526)
 Richemont (76527)
 Rieux (76528)
 Rocquemont (76532)
 Roncherolles-en-Bray (76535)
 Ronchois (76537)
 Rosay (76538)
 Rouvray-Catillon (76544)
 Rouxmesnil-Bouteilles (76545)
 Royville (76546)
 Saâne-Saint-Just (76549)
 Saint-Aubin-le-Cauf (76562)
 Saint-Aubin-sur-Mer (76564)
 Saint-Aubin-sur-Scie (76565)
 Saint-Crespin (76570)
 Saint-Denis-d'Aclon (76572)
 Saint-Denis-sur-Scie (76574)
 Sainte-Agathe-d'Aliermont (76553)
 Sainte-Beuve-en-Rivière (76567)
 Sainte-Colombe (76569)
 Sainte-Foy (76577)
 Sainte-Geneviève (76578)
 Sainte-Marguerite-sur-Mer (76605)
 Saint-Germain-d'Étables (76582)
 Saint-Germain-sur-Eaulne (76584)
 Saint-Hellier (76588)
 Saint-Honoré (76589)
 Saint-Jacques-d'Aliermont (76590)
 Saint-Léger-aux-Bois (76598)
 Saint-Lucien (76601)
 Saint-Maclou-de-Folleville (76602)
 Saint-Mards (76604)
 Saint-Martin-au-Bosc (76612)
 Saint-Martin-aux-Buneaux (76613)
 Saint-Martin-le-Gaillard (76619)
 Saint-Martin-l'Hortier (76620)
 Saint-Martin-Osmonville (76621)
 Saint-Michel-d'Halescourt (76623)
 Saint-Nicolas-d'Aliermont (76624)
 Saint-Ouen-du-Breuil (76628)
 Saint-Ouen-le-Mauger (76629)
 Saint-Ouen-sous-Bailly (76630)
 Saint-Pierre-Bénouville (76632)
 Saint-Pierre-des-Jonquières (76635)
 Saint-Pierre-en-Val (76638)
 Saint-Pierre-le-Vieux (76641)
 Saint-Pierre-le-Viger (76642)
 Saint-Rémy-Boscrocourt (76644)
 Saint-Riquier-en-Rivière (76645)
 Saint-Riquier-ès-Plains (76646)
 Saint-Saëns (76648)
 Saint-Saire (76649)
 Saint-Sylvain (76651)
 Saint-Vaast-d'Équiqueville (76652)
 Saint-Vaast-Dieppedalle (76653)
 Saint-Vaast-du-Val (76654)
 Saint-Valery-en-Caux (76655)
 Saint-Victor-l'Abbaye (76656)
 Sassetot-le-Malgardé (76662)
 Sasseville (76664)
 Sauchay (76665)
 Saumont-la-Poterie (76666)
 Sauqueville (76667)
 Sept-Meules (76671)
 Serqueux (76672)
 Sigy-en-Bray (76676)
 Smermesnil (76677)
 Sommery (76678)
 Sommesnil (76679)
 Sotteville-sur-Mer (76683)
 Thil-Manneville (76690)
 Le Thil-Riberpré (76691)
 Thiouville (76692)
 Tocqueville-en-Caux (76694)
 Torcy-le-Grand (76697)
 Torcy-le-Petit (76698)
 Tôtes (76700)
 Touffreville-sur-Eu (76703)
 Tourville-sur-Arques (76707)
 Le Tréport (76711)
 Val-de-Saâne (76018)
 Val-de-Scie (76034)
 Varengeville-sur-Mer (76720)
 Varneville-Bretteville (76721)
 Vassonville (76723)
 Vatierville (76724)
 Veauville-lès-Quelles (76730)
 Vénestanville (76731)
 Ventes-Saint-Rémy (76733)
 Veules-les-Roses (76735)
 Veulettes-sur-Mer (76736)
 Vieux-Rouen-sur-Bresle (76739)
 Villers-sous-Foucarmont (76744)
 Villy-sur-Yères (76745)
 Vittefleur (76748)
 Wanchy-Capval (76749)

History

The arrondissement of Dieppe was created in 1800. At the January 2017 reorganisation of the arrondissements of Seine-Maritime, it received 12 communes from the arrondissement of Le Havre and four communes from the arrondissement of Rouen, and it lost four communes to the arrondissement of Rouen.

As a result of the reorganisation of the cantons of France which came into effect in 2015, the borders of the cantons are no longer related to the borders of the arrondissements. The cantons of the arrondissement of Dieppe were, as of January 2015:

 Argueil
 Aumale
 Bacqueville-en-Caux
 Bellencombre
 Blangy-sur-Bresle
 Cany-Barville
 Dieppe-Est
 Dieppe-Ouest
 Envermeu
 Eu
 Fontaine-le-Dun
 Forges-les-Eaux
 Gournay-en-Bray
 Londinières
 Longueville-sur-Scie
 Neufchâtel-en-Bray
 Offranville
 Saint-Saëns
 Saint-Valery-en-Caux
 Tôtes

References

Dieppe